Persée et Andromède is the 1921 first opera of Jacques Ibert. A recording, with Yann Beuron and Annick Massis in the title roles and Philippe Rouillon as the monster, was conducted by Jan Latham-Koenig in 2002 for Avie.

References

Operas
1921 operas
French-language operas